"Man's Not Hot" is a novelty song by British comedian Michael Dapaah, released under the name Big Shaq. It samples an instrumental by GottiOnEm and Mazza, which was first used on 86's "Lurk" and later on "Let's Lurk" by 67 featuring Giggs. The song saw commercial success, peaking at number three on the UK Singles Chart. The song has been certified platinum in the United Kingdom by the BPI, indicating 600,000 combined sales and streams. The music video has also gained over 400 million views on YouTube.

Background and release
On 10 May 2017, Dapaah uploaded a sketch to his Instagram featuring his character Roadman Shaq "freestyling" to the instrumental of "Lurk" originally used by UK drill group 86, and more popularly the 2016 song "Let's Lurk", by UK drill group 67 and rapper Giggs.

On 19 July 2017, Dapaah's freestyle, slightly extended, appeared on episode 6 of the first series of his mockumentary SWIL, when he performed it in front of 67 as Roadman Shaq.

On 29 August 2017, Dapaah went on BBC Radio 1Xtra as both his characters MC Quakez and Roadman Shaq for the Charlie Sloth-hosted "Fire in the Booth" segment. He performed the freestyle, again slightly extended, and it went viral on the internet, gaining millions of views on YouTube and resulting in the creation of many internet memes. In response to the unprecedented popularity, Dapaah changed his character's name to "Big Shaq" and converted his freestyle into a commercial single called "Man's Not Hot", released on Island Records. The song was released on 22 September 2017.

The song was covered by American hip hop band The Roots on The Tonight Show Starring Jimmy Fallon, when retired American basketball player Shaquille O'Neal appeared as a guest on 10 October 2017. On 16 October 2017, O'Neal released a diss track criticising Dapaah for calling himself "Big Shaq".

On 15 December 2017, Man's Not Hot (The Remixes), an album comprising remixes of the song by various artists, was released; alongside a "Christmas edition" of the song. Two weeks later, an "MC Mix" of the song, featuring British rappers Lethal Bizzle, Chip, Krept & Konan and Jme, was released on 29 December 2017.

In June 2018, the song trended in Malta.

Critical reception 
Pitchfork listed "Man's Not Hot" at number 93 on their list of best songs of 2017, opining that it "joins in a tradition of songs [...] that so expertly lampoon their chosen genre they become part of its firmament."

Remix 
American rapper Futuristic released his remix of the song on 13 January 2018.

Music video
Dapaah released the music video for "Man's Not Hot" on 26 October 2017. It begins with a phone call from someone called Asznee, who is later revealed to be entertainer Chunkz. It then alternates between Dapaah rapping in Toronto and Miami, wearing his trademark jacket. The video features cameos from American rappers Waka Flocka Flame, Lil Yachty, Jim Jones, Dutch rap group Broederliefde and American producer DJ Khaled, who calls Dapaah's character a "legend".

Commercial use 
In 2022 Peloton used the song for a holiday commercial.

Track listing

Charts

Weekly charts

Year-end charts

Certifications

References

2017 songs
2017 singles
Internet memes introduced in 2017
Island Records singles
Viral videos
Comedy rap songs
Novelty songs
UK drill songs
2017 YouTube videos